Bishop Mile Bogović (7 August 1939 – 19 December 2020) was a Croatian Roman Catholic prelate who served as a Titular Bishop of Tamata and Auxiliary Bishop of Archdiocese of Rijeka–Senj from 4 June 1999 until 25 May 2000 and the first Diocesan Bishop of the newly created Gospić-Senj since 25 May 2000 until his retirement on 4 April 2016.

Education
Bishop Bogović was born into a Croatian Roman Catholic family of Mijo and Manda (née Piršić) near Slunj in the Central Croatia.

After graduation at a primary school in Slunj and a classical gymnasium in the diocesan seminary in Pazin, he was admitted to the Major Seminary here and consequently joined the Theological Faculty at the University of Zagreb, where he studied until 1964, and was ordained as priest on July 5, 1964 for the Diocese of Rijeka–Opatija, after completing his philosophical and theological studies. After the short two years interval for the pastoral work, Fr. Bogović continued his studies at the Pontifical Gregorian University in Rome, Italy from 1966 until 1971 with a Doctor of the Church history degree.

Pastoral work
Fr. Bogović served as the parish priest in Krivi Put and at the same time the chaplain in Slunj (1964–1966). After his return from studies in Italy, he performed the following duties: he was the personal assistant of Archbishop Viktor Burić, rector of the Theological Faculty at the University of Rijeka, parish priest in Praputnjak near Bakar, Vicar General of the Archdiocese of Rijeka–Senj and professor of a church history at the University of Rijeka.

Bishop
On 4 June 1999 he was appointed by Pope John Paul II as an Auxiliary Bishop of the Archdiocese of Rijeka–Senj. On 29 June 1999 he was consecrated as bishop by Archbishop Anton Tamarut and other prelates of the Roman Catholic Church in the St. Vid Cathedral in Rijeka. One year later, on 25 May 2000, he became the first Diocesan Bishop of the newly created Gospić-Senj.

He retired on 4 April 2016, after he reached age limit of 75 years old.

Bogović died from COVID-19 during the COVID-19 pandemic in Croatia on 19 December 2020.

References

1939 births
2020 deaths
People from Karlovac County
University of Zagreb alumni
Pontifical Gregorian University alumni
20th-century Roman Catholic bishops in Croatia
21st-century Roman Catholic bishops in Croatia
Deaths from the COVID-19 pandemic in Croatia
Bishops appointed by Pope John Paul II